Nashlie H. Sephus is an American computer engineer and entrepreneur specialized in machine learning and algorithmic bias identification. She is a technology evangelist at Amazon Web Services. Sephus is cofounder and chief executive officer of Bean Path, a nonprofit startup company developing Jackson Tech District, a planned community and business incubator in Jackson, Mississippi.

Life 
Sephus was born in Jackson, Mississippi, where she was raised in an all female household. She attended a two-week sleep away engineering camp for girls that introduced her to computer engineering. Sephus graduated from Murrah High School in 2003. In 2007, she completed a B.S. in computer engineering at Mississippi State University. After graduating, Sephus won a GEM fellowship, which provided her a full-tuition graduate scholarship, internships, and a job placement at Delphi Electronics & Safety upon finishing her Ph.D. She earned a master's degree and Ph.D. (2014) in electrical and computer engineering from the Georgia Institute of Technology College of Engineering. Her dissertation was titled A framework for exploiting modulation spectral features in music data mining and other applications.

In 2013, Sephus, then a doctoral student, began working part-time for the all black women startup Partpic, where she developed visual recognition algorithms and prototypes. Sephus later worked as a software engineer at Exponent in New York. In 2015, she joined Partpic full time as their chief technology officer. In 2016, Amazon acquired Partpic, and Sephus became leader of the Amazon Visual Search team in Atlanta. Sephus later became a machine learning and applied science manager at Amazon Web Services Artificial Intelligence. Her team develops tools for bias-identification for machine learning models. She is currently a technology evangelist at Amazon.

In 2018, Sephus began plans to create a technology community and business incubator in Jackson, Mississippi as part of her nonprofit startup company Bean Path. She is the company's cofounder and CEO. In 2019, Sephus and Julie Cwikla were awarded an Ada Lovelace Award. On September 11, 2020, Sephus purchased 12 acres next to Jackson State University to create the Jackson Tech District.

See also 

 African-American women in computer science
 Women in engineering in the United States

References

External links
 

Living people
Year of birth missing (living people)
Businesspeople from Jackson, Mississippi
21st-century African-American women
21st-century African-American scientists
21st-century American businesswomen
21st-century American businesspeople
21st-century American women scientists
21st-century American engineers
Mississippi State University alumni
Georgia Tech alumni
Technology evangelists
Amazon (company) people
Engineers from Mississippi
American women computer scientists
American computer scientists
Computer engineers
African-American computer scientists
African-American women engineers
American women engineers
African-American engineers